Under False Flag (German: Unter falscher Flagge) is a 1932 German  spy thriller film directed by Johannes Meyer and starring Charlotte Susa, Gustav Fröhlich and Friedrich Kayssler. It was shot at the Johannisthal Studios in Berlin from the end of November 1931 to the beginning of 1932. It was made by Deutsche Universal, the German branch of Universal Pictures, in co-production with Tobis Film. The film's sets were designed by the art director Otto Hunte. It premiered at Berlin's Ufa-Palast am Zoo. The film was based on the novel of the same title by Max W. Kimmich, who also worked on the screenplay.

In 1934 Universal made an American remake Madame Spy in Hollywood with Fay Wray and  Edward Arnold and directed by Karl Freund.

Plot 
Captain Herbert Frank (Gustav Fröhlich), a German intelligence officer, fights in World War I and gets severely wounded in 1916. While in hospital, he is cared for devotional by a nurse called Maria Horn (Charlotte Susa). Later on, he asks her to become his wife, and she gives in to him. But just a few days after their wartime wedding, her husband is commanded to Berlin, where he is appointed to the chief of the counterintelligence service against Russia.

Meanwhile, the Russian secret service has got wind of a coming-up German attack and is eager to get hold of the German attack plans. Frank and his two assistants, Captain Weber and Commissioner Schulz soon find out that the most dangerous agent at the Russian side is a certain Sulkin, whom nobody seems to know. After a short time, Schulz and Weber begin throwing their suspicion on Maria. But as they do not want to destroy their boss's marriage, they begin to observe her secretly. One day, they follow her to the Marabou-Bar, where Maria's brother is acting as a singer. Here they get final evidence that Maria and the mysterious Sulkin are identical. But Maria manages to escape, while her brother, whom she had informed about her work for the secret service, is killed by the Russian counterespionage. When Frank learns that his wife had been an enemy agent, he nearly collapses. Later on, he asks for being sent to the front with a suicide squad.

Meanwhile, Maria has returned to Russia. She feels sorry for the abuse of confidence she offended at her husband, and wants to make up for it again. But when she tries to withdraw her giving-in to working as a secret agent, her bosses pretend that Frank had killed her brother, so that she begins to hate him. Some time later, she and Frank meet each other at a big ball in Russia by accident. First she wants to tell him on and leads his fingerprints to the Russian secret service, but in the end he is able to convince her of his innocence at her brother's death. Now that she is convinced of his innocence, she helps him to escape, but is killed at this occasion.

Cast
 Charlotte Susa as 	Maria Horn
 Gustav Fröhlich as 	Hauptmann Herbert Frank
 Friedrich Kayssler as 	Oberst Seefeldt
 Hermann Speelmans as 	Kriminalkommissar Schulz
 Ernst Dumcke as 	Hauptmannn Weber
 Joseph Almas as 	Blumenhändler Jahnke
 Gerhard Ritterband as 	Lehrling Peter
 Hans Brausewetter as 	Fred
 Hadrian Maria Netto as 	Direktor der Marabubar
 Elza Temary as 	Bardame Lilo
 Hedwig Wangel as 	Frl. Schmidt, Garderobiere
 Arthur Bergen as 	Bubi
 Theodor Loos as Rakowski
 Aribert Wäscher as General Fürst Urussow
 Harry Hardt as Hauptmann Sergei Petrovich
 Karl Hannemann as Garagenbesitzer
 Fritz Klippel as Monteur

References

Bibliography
 Goble, Alan. The Complete Index to Literary Sources in Film. Walter de Gruyter, 1999.
Klaus, Ulrich J.: German soundfilms. Film encyclopedia of full-length German and German-speaking sound films, sorted by their German first showings. - Ulrich J. Klaus / Berlin [et al.] - (Klaus-Archive, Vol. 3, 1932)

External links 
 

1932 films
Films of the Weimar Republic
1930s spy films
German spy films
1930s German-language films
World War I spy films
German black-and-white films
1930s German films
Films shot at Johannisthal Studios
Universal Pictures films
Tobis Film films
Films directed by Johannes Meyer
Films set in Berlin
Films based on German novels